The Sanggan River or Sanggan He, also known in English as Sangkan River, is a river in northern China. It runs 506 kilometers and has a drainage area of 23,900 squared kilometers. In addition to its significance in hydrology, it is culturally significant as it has been mentioned in various poems, essays, and novels, including a poem by Chen Tao and an award-winning novel The Sun Shines Over Sanggan River by Ding Ling. It is also one of the rivers that gave birth to early civilizations.

Geology
The Sangan River is a part of the drainage system of Hai River. It originates in Shanxi Province. It merges with the Yang He (洋河) in Hebei Province and then flows into the Guanting Reservoir. The outflow of the reservoir is known as the Yongding River (formerly known as the Wuding River).

See also
Ding Ling
Shanxi
Zhuolu County

Notes

References
Davis, A. R. (Albert Richard), Editor and Introduction, The Penguin Book of Chinese Verse. (Baltimore: Penguin Books (1970).
Sivin, Nathan et al., eds. (1988) The Contemporary Atlas of China. London: Weidenfeld and Nicolson. 

Rivers of Shanxi
Rivers of Hebei